A List of Czech films of the 1990s.

1990s
Czech
Films